Paola (born Pagona Karamitsou on 25 June 1982) is a Greek singer.

Early life and career
Born on 25 June 1982 in Thessaloniki and raised in Sykia Halkidiki. Ηer Greek parents, Alexandros and Maria, were also musicians. She has an older brother Pericles. Paola began singing at 14 years old at the suggestion of a shopkeeper and with the approval of her parents. At 19, she was singing in the nightclub Mamounia in Thessaloniki.

Career
In 2005 she published her first album, Silent, and then moved to Athens to work with Stamatis Gonidis. In 2007 she worked with Sotis Volanis on a duet titled "Grandma and Grandpa" which enjoyed great success. In 2008 she released her second album, "We went with red." In 2012, she released the album "Be One With me" which went gold with tracks including Be With Me One, Fault, Be quiet m'afiseis want, Artificial, What catches.  On 24 April 2013 she released the album "After The Midnight" which went platinum within three days. In December 2013, she released the album The Truth Alone containing the successful songs: Hold On, Finished Statements Zero. Hold On was the 10th biggest radio hit of 2013. On 17 November 2014 she released the new song I A Life, foreshadowing the next disc I hide vagrancy, released in early 2015. The songs that stood out from this disc are:  I A Life, These I said God, How Many Times, Cold Embrace.

Personal life
On 8 April 2003 she gave birth to a daughter, Paolina.

Discography 
 Athoryva (Silent), 2005
 Perasame me kokkino (We Went with Red), 2008
 Gine mazi mou ena (Be One with Me), 2012
 Meta ta mesanihta (live)
 H moni alitheia
 Krivo alitia

References 

21st-century Greek women singers
1982 births
Living people
Singers from Thessaloniki